Ivy was an American indie pop band composed of Andy Chase, Adam Schlesinger, and Dominique Durand.  They were active between 1994 and 2012.

History
In 1991, Andy Chase placed an ad that attracted fellow multi-instrumentalist Adam Schlesinger. In 1994 they met Dominique Durand, a native of Paris who had moved to New York City to study English, and with whom they shared admiration for The Go-Betweens, The House of Love, The Pastels, Prefab Sprout and The Smiths. Although Durand had never sung in a group, she was persuaded by Chase and Schlesinger to sing on some demos, and Ivy was formed.

Lately and Realistic

In 1994, Ivy signed with Seed Records and released "Get Enough," which the UK magazine Melody Maker named Single of the Week, followed by the EP Lately. In 1995, they released their first full-length album, Realistic. Lately'''s cover version of "I Guess I'm Just a Little Too Sensitive" impressed its author, Edwyn Collins of Orange Juice, so much that he invited them to tour together. Ivy also toured during this period with Lloyd Cole, Madder Rose, and Saint Etienne.

Apartment LifeApartment Life (released October 6, 1997 on Atlantic Records) was praised by critics as one of the year's best albums and established Ivy as a band that wrote pleasant, well-crafted pop songs. They were assisted by several guest musicians, including Lloyd Cole, James Iha, Dean Wareham and Chris Botti.
The album received more attention when "This Is the Day" and "I Get the Message" appeared on the soundtrack for the movie There's Something About Mary.Apartment Life, however, did not produce any hits, and Ivy was dropped by Atlantic. They signed with 550 Music on the condition that the band reissue the album.  According to Schlesinger, four of the songs were remixed and the album was remastered and re-released on October 7, 1998.

Long DistanceLong Distance, their third LP, was released on July 10, 2001 on Nettwerk, and won the group a wider audience both at home and abroad. The album was released on November 8, 2000 in Japan, seven months prior to its US release, and the Japanese edition included a bonus track, "It's All in Your Mind" (the US version included The Blow Monkeys cover "Digging Your Scene" as a bonus track instead).

On Long Distance, lush soundscapes and dense rhythm tracks were brought to the fore, and bouncy pop songs were outnumbered by moodier, more atmospheric songs like single "Edge of the Ocean". Promotional videos were created for that song and the lead single, "Lucy Doesn't Love You".

By this time, the band had also found success on both the big and small screens, scoring the Farrelly Brothers’ Shallow Hal, as well as having their songs featured prominently in numerous films and television shows. Chase and Schlesinger had also begun to receive attention for their work outside the band: Chase produced the debut album by French pop group Tahiti 80, which was a hit in many countries and led to production work with several other groups; Schlesinger’s other band, Fountains of Wayne, released two critically acclaimed records, and he also received an Oscar nomination for his title song to Tom Hanks's film That Thing You Do!.

Guestroom
Ivy released Guestroom on September 10, 2002 on Minty Fresh. The album contained 10 of the group's favorite cover songs, including The Cure's "Let's Go to Bed", House of Love's "I Don't Know Why I Love You", Steely Dan's "Only a Fool Would Say That", Serge Gainsbourg's "L'Anamour" (previously a B-side on the "I've Got a Feeling" single), The Ronettes' "Be My Baby" and Papas Fritas' "Say Goodbye". Picking from several different eras, they revealed some of their sources of inspiration, and also displayed their ability to reinterpret many different types of songs in their own distinct way. Five of the 10 songs on Guestroom were recorded during one group of sessions in New York. The remaining five tracks were recorded at different times over the course of Ivy’s career, but were difficult to find, having been released only on limited-edition singles, compilations or soundtracks.

"Digging Your Scene" was also included on the album, and released in Japan and UK as a CD single. A video for "Let's Go to Bed" was shot, depicting Durand and Chase in their NYC apartment, later joined by Iha.

The Lately EP was reissued in 2003 on Unfiltered Records with the same track list as the original.

Ivy gained even wider recognition in 2003–2004 for their song "Worry About You", which was used as the theme song of the Stephen King series Kingdom Hospital and in the pilot episode of the television series The 4400.

In the ClearIn the Clear was released on March 1, 2005 on Nettwerk.

Ivy brought in UK producer Steve Osborne (New Order, Happy Mondays, Starsailor, Elbow) for his first-ever New York sessions to mix seven of the tracks.In the Clear also featured guest appearances by friends like Iha, Porter, Brazilian string arranger Zé Luis (Bebel Gilberto, Caetano Veloso), and former Girls Against Boys frontman Scott McLoud, who dueted with Durand on the closing track, "Feel So Free".

The album was given a warmer reception than previous releases. An animated promotional video clip was created for "Thinking About You".

All HoursAll Hours was released on September 20, 2011 on Nettwerk. The first single from the album, "Distant Lights", was released on June 7, 2011, and the second single, "Fascinated," was released on July 26, 2011. The third and final single, "Lost in the Sun", was released on April 10, 2012.

Influences
Ivy have cited The Go-Betweens, Burt Bacharach, Antônio Carlos Jobim, Orange Juice, The Smiths, The Velvet Underground & Nico, The Beatles and Françoise Hardy as influences, as well as other artists covered on Guestroom.

Durand's vocal technique and Parisian pronunciation are often compared by reviewers to another French singer, Lætitia Sadier of Stereolab.

Other work
Schlesinger was also a member of the bands Fountains of Wayne and Tinted Windows.

Durand and Chase, with Michael Hampton, recorded one album, 2004's This Is Where We Live, as Paco.

Chase's solo project, called Brookville, released three albums: Wonderfully Nothing (2003), Life in the Shade (2006) and Broken Lights (2009). In November 2012, Brookville changed their name to Camera2, releasing the "Just About Made It" single, followed by EP releases in 2013 and 2014.

In his video "How Music Should Sound," Rick Beato mentioned he played with the band for "about six weeks" in 1994.

 Discography 

 Realistic (1995)
 Apartment Life (1997)
 Long Distance (2000)
 Guestroom (2002)
 In the Clear (2005)
 All Hours (2011)

Film and TV work
Film workThere's Something About Mary (1998) – featured "This Is the Day" and "I Get the Message" The Rage: Carrie 2 – (1999) featured "Quick, Painless and Easy"  Me, Myself & Irene (2000) – featured a cover of Steely Dan's "Only a Fool Would Say That"Angel Eyes (2001) – featured "Edge of the Ocean" on the official soundtrackShallow Hal (2001) – featured a score by Ivy as well as "Edge of the Ocean" and "I Think of You"  Orange County (2002) – featured "I've Got a Feeling" Insomnia (2002) – featured "One More Last Kiss"  Bee Season (2005) – featured "I'll Be Near You"  Numb (2007) – featured "Thinking about You" and "Edge of the Ocean" Shanghai Kiss (2007) – featured "Nothing But the Sky" Music and Lyrics (2007) – featured "Edge of the Ocean" during the end credits (Schlesinger also wrote three of the songs in the movie)

TV workAlias – "Edge of the Ocean" was featured in the season 1 episode "Time Will Tell"Veronica Mars (UPN series) – "Edge of the Ocean" was featured in episodes "Meet John Smith" and "One Angry Veronica"; "Feel so Free" in "Clash of the Tritons"; and "Ocean City Girl" in "Ahoy, Mateys!" Roswell – "Undertow" was featured at the end of "Heart of Mine"; the band appeared as themselves in 2001 episode "To Have and to Hold" and performed "Edge of the Ocean"The 4400 – "Worry About You" was featured in the pilot episodeKingdom Hospital – "Worry About You" was used as the theme songGrey's Anatomy – "Edge of the Ocean" was featured in 2005 episode "Shake Your Groove Thing", and "Feel So Free" in 2005 episode "Raindrops Keep Falling on My Head"Pinoy Big Brother – Season 2 – "Worry About You" was featured in multiple episodes LAX – "Nothing But the Sky" was featured in the final episode of the seriesWitchblade – "Undertow" was featured in season 1 episode "Legion"Sleeper Cell – "Undertow" was featuredFelicity'' – "I've Got a Feeling" was featured in the pilot and first season finale
Senseo coffee makers featured "Edge of the Ocean" in a commercial

References

External links
Ivy homepage
Ivy MySpace profile

Ivy at Soundcloud 

Indie pop groups from New York (state)
American musical trios
Musical groups from New York City
1994 establishments in New York City
Musical groups established in 1994
Atlantic Records artists
Indie rock musical groups from New York (state)
Nettwerk Music Group artists
550 Music artists